Makhdum Karim or Karim ul-Makhdum was an Arab Sufi Muslim missionary from Arabia who came from Malacca. Makhdum Karim was born in Makdonia, him and the Wali sanga were affiliated with the Kubrawi Hamadani missionaries in the late 14th century. He was a Sufi who brought Islam to the Philippines in 1380, 141 years before Portuguese explorer Ferdinand Magellan arrived in the country. He established a mosque in Simunul Island, Tawi Tawi, Philippines, known as Sheik Karimal Makdum Mosque which is the oldest mosque in the country.

Commemoration  
On arrival to the Philippines, he built a mosque in Simunul island, Tawi-Tawi. The construction is celebrated annually in the southern Philippines as anniversary of the coming of Makhdum Karim. The celebration offers prayers that commemorate the propagation of Islam in the Philippines.

In 2005, Governor of Autonomous Region in Muslim Mindanao Zaldy Ampatuan has appealed to the Philippine government, Saudi Arabia and other Muslim countries to rehabilitate the mosque and develop it as a religious tourist spot in southern Philippines.

References

Malaysian expatriates in the Philippines
Islam in the Philippines
Muslim missionaries
Year of death unknown
Year of birth unknown